Metachorista is a genus of moths belonging to the subfamily Tortricinae of the family Tortricidae.

Species
Metachorista austera Diakonoff, 1954
Metachorista caliginosa Diakonoff, 1973
Metachorista deltophora Diakonoff, 1954
Metachorista evidens Diakonoff, 1973
Metachorista loepa Diakonoff, 1954
Metachorista longiseta Razowski, 2013
Metachorista megalophrys Diakonoff, 1954
Metachorista mesata Diakonoff, 1954
Metachorista refracta Diakonoff, 1954
Metachorista spermatodesma Diakonoff, 1974
Metachorista tineoides Diakonoff, 1954
Metachorista ursula Meyrick, 1938

See also
List of Tortricidae genera

References

External links
tortricidae.com

Schoenotenini
Moth genera
Taxa named by Edward Meyrick